The following is a timeline of the history of the city of Wichita, Kansas, USA.

Prior to 20th century
 1864 - Jesse Chisholm establishes a trading post
 1865 - Treaty of Little Arkansas
 1868 - James R. Mead established another trading post
 1870 - City of Wichita incorporated in Sedgwick County, Kansas.
 1872
 Santa Fe Railway built.
 The Wichita Eagle and The Wichita Daily Beacon newspapers begins publication.
 1880 - Wichita annexed the Delano community on the west side of the river, which then became locally known as "West Wichita".
 1885 - Topeka State Journal newspaper in publication.
 1887
 Women enfranchised.
 Roman Catholic Diocese of Wichita established.
 1888 
 Wichita Children's Home founded 
 All Hallows Academy established.
 1889 - Albert Hyde invents Mentholatum
1890 - Sedgwick County Courthouse built.
 1891 - Thursday Afternoon Cooking Club founded.
 1892 - Fairmount Institute opens, later becomes Wichita State University.
 1898 - Garfield University established, later becomes Friends University. 
 1900 - December 27: Temperance activist "Carry Nation smashes the Hotel Carey saloon."

20th century
 1905 - Waco Elementary School built.
 1909
 City commission form of government adopted.
 Wichita Union Stockyards Exchange Building constructed.
 1910 - First Presbyterian Church and Municipal Forum built.
 1911
 Henry's (clothiers) in business.
 Central Intermediate School built.
 1912 - Wesley Medical Center established.
 1915 - Wichita City Library built.
 1917 - Office of city manager established.
 1918
 Fountain installed at Union Station Plaza.
 Exposition Building constructed.
 1919 - The Negro Star newspaper in publication.
 1920 - Population: 72,217.
 1921 - White Castle (restaurant) in business.
 1922 - Orpheum Theatre and Miller Theater open.
 1924 - Wichita East High School built.
 1926 - Municipal University of Wichita established, later becomes Wichita State University.
 1927 - Cessna Aircraft Company in business.
 1929
 Wichita Municipal Airport construction begins, later becomes McConnell Air Force Base.
 Wichita North High School built.
 1931 - McKnight memorial statue erected.
 1932
 Beech Aircraft Corp. in business.
 United States Post Office and Federal Building constructed.
 Minisa Bridge dedicated.
 1934 - Lawrence Athletic Field opened, later becomes Lawrence–Dumont Stadium.
 1935 - Wichita Art Museum built.
 1950 - Population: 168,279.
 1952 - Old Cowtown Museum established.
 1953
 Wichita Mid-Continent Airport built, later becomes Wichita Dwight D. Eisenhower National Airport.
 US military Wichita Air Force Base in use.
 Field House at University of Wichita built, later becomes Charles Koch Arena.
 1954 
Wichita Audubon Society founded.
Autopilot invented by David D. Blanton
 1958
 July: Dockum Drug Store sit-in for civil rights.
 Pizza Hut in business.
 1964 - Wichita State University established.
 1967 - Central Wichita Public Library building dedicated.
 1969
 Century II opened, after razing blocks of warehouse district south of Douglas Street.
 Cessna Stadium expansion of Veteran Field at Wichita State University built.
 250 Douglas Place hi-rise built.
 1970 - Population: 276,554.
1971 - Sedgwick County Zoo founded. 
 1972 - Kansas African American Museum founded.
 1975 - Towne East Square shopping mall in business.
 1976 - Mid-America All-Indian Center established.
 1977 - Kansas Coliseum opens.
 1979 - April 15: Herman Hill riot.
 1980 - Towne West Square shopping mall in business.
 1984 - Kansas Food Bank established.
 1987 - Botanica, The Wichita Gardens open.
 1989 - Epic Center hi-rise built.
 1990 - Population: 304,011
 1991 - The Wichita-Andover, KS F5 tornado strikes
 1992 - Wichita Thunder ice hockey team formed.
 1993 - Southwind Sangha Sōtō Zen Association founded.
 1997 - City website online (approximate date).

21st century
 2006 - Spirit AeroSystems Inc. in business.
 2009 - May 31: Assassination of George Tiller, abortion doctor.
 2010
 Intrust Bank Arena opens.
 Population: 382,368.
 2011 - Mike Pompeo becomes U.S. representative for Kansas's 4th congressional district.
 2012 - Tornado outbreak of April 13–16, 2012.
 2013 - Alleged 2013 Wichita bombing plot thwarted.
 2015 - Jeff Longwell becomes mayor.
2020 - Brandon Whipple becomes mayor.
2021 - EF4 in Wichita killed 20, injured 158

See also
 History of Wichita, Kansas
 Timeline of Kansas
 Timeline of Topeka, Kansas

References

Bibliography

 
 
  (fulltext)

External links

 Digital Public Library of America. Items related to Wichita, various dates

 
wichita
Kansas-related lists
Years in Kansas